Indecent Proposal is the second studio album by American hip hop duo Timbaland & Magoo. It was released on November 20, 2001, through Blackground/Virgin Records. Production was entirely handled by Timbaland himself, except for two songs, which were produced with Craig Brockman. It features guest appearances from Sebastian, Petey Pablo, Static Major, Sin, Tweet, Aaliyah, DJ S&S, Fatman Scoop, Jay-Z, Ludacris, Mad Skillz, Ms. Jade, Troy Mitchell and Twista. The album is dedicated to the memory of Aaliyah, who had died in a plane crash on August 25, 2001.

The two official singles from Indecent Proposal were "Drop", and the Indian-influenced "All Y'all". The final track on the album, "I am Music", was recorded as a Da Bassment reunion collaboration between Aaliyah, Playa, and rock musician Beck, though Beck's vocals weren't used on the release.

Track listing

Charts

References

External links

2001 albums
Timbaland albums
Magoo (rapper) albums
Albums produced by Timbaland
Albums produced by Craig Brockman